Judika Nalom Abadi Sihotang (born August 31, 1978) is an Indonesian singer and actor. He has released seven albums (some of which were multi-platinum selling) and received multiple awards including Anugerah Musik Indonesia and Anugerah Planet Muzik. Three of his songs were featured as soundtracks in Indonesian drama series.

Judika started his professional singing career as a runner-up in Indonesian Idol season 2 in 2005. He also has been a judge in multiple singing talent shows Indonesian Idol, X Factor Indonesia, The Voice Indonesia, Rising Star Indonesia, and The Indonesian Next Big Star. He has starred in six feature films including Fire Squad and The Tarix Jabrix 2.

Early life
Born and grow up in Berastagi, North Sumatra, Judika Nalon Abadi Sihotang is the sixth child of seven children from Sumanggar Sihotang and Nursia Silalahi. His father works as a civil servant in the religious department. Before becoming a singer, Judika has explored various jobs including shoe polisher, tire repair, and busking.

Since elementary school, Judika has been fond of singing. He made a vocal group with his brother, Roy and two friends in which, they were contracted at a 5-star international hotel in Brastagi. He also took part in the student voice contest Bahana Suara Pelajar in 1993, He won first place at the North Sumatra level and was in third place at the National level. He had studied accounting in STMIK Bina Mulya but, decided to leave to pursue a professional career as a singer.

Career

1998–2006: Career beginnings and Indonesian Idol

Judika took part in the Asia Bagus talent search show in 1998 in Singapore. He won 2nd place and then formed a trio group called Antero Boys which consisted of Asia Bagus participants. This group appeared on all national television networks. Judika still had to take a regular job as a cafe singer in Jakarta as their career were unstable.

In the seventh year of the group's establishment, Judika joined Indonesian Idol season 2 audition in 2005. He received a golden ticket, continued to the final round and became a runner-up.

2007–2010: One, Setengah Mati Merindu and acting debut
After Indonesian Idol, Judika was signed to Sony Music Indonesia in 2007 and released his first single "Bukan Rayuan Gombal". His debut studio album, One, was released on January 22. In 2008, he made his acting debut and starred in Fire Squad directed by Iqbal Rais in which, he won an award for Favorite Newcomer Actor at the 2009 Indonesian Movie Awards. Judika also then starred at The Tarix Jabrix 2.

In 2010, Judika released his second studio album Setengah Mati Merindu. He produced the lead single "Setengah Mati Merindu" which, earned a nomination for Best Male (Artist) in 2011 Anugerah Planet Muzik. Judika's song "Bukan Dia Tapi Aku" also earned a nomination for Most Popular Regional Song at the 2012 Anugerah Planet Muzik.

2011–2014: Mahadewa, Mencari Cinta and Hati & Cinta
In 2011, Judika joined a band formed by Ahmad Dhani, Mahadewa and released the first single "Cinta Itu Buta". In 2013, Judika released his third album Mencari Cinta after being signed by Sony Music Indonesia twice as a solo artist. He also released a song "Sampai Akhir" with  his wife, Duma Riris Silalahi for his wedding.

Judika's fourth studio album Hati & Cinta was released on November 20, 2014. One of the album's song list "Sampai Kau Jadi Milikku" reached high rank in the Indonesian chart song and radio. Judika announced through Twitter that he had decided to depart Mahadewa and was replaced by Virzha, an Indonesian Idol season 8 finalist.

2015–present: Departure from Mahadewa and became a talent search judge
In January 2016, Judika was appointed as a coach in The Voice Indonesia with Agnez Mo, Kaka Slank and Ari Lasso. Judika was also an expert on Rising Star Indonesia for season 2 and season 3 with Rossa and Ariel.

Siti Nurhaliza chose Judika as one of the Indonesian musicians to collaborate for a song entitled "Kisa Ku Inginkan" with her in 2017, and won the 2018 Anugerah Planet Muzik for Best Collaboration Category.

Judika released a single on June 28, 2019, "Cinta Karena Cinta" which is, adapted from Nicholas Tse's "Yin Wei Ai Suo Yi Ai". The song reached Billboard Indonesia Top 100 as a number-one singles and was chosen as the theme song for Indonesian drama series Cinta Karena Cinta. It also won the 2019 Most Popular Drama Series Soundtrack in the SCTV Awards. 

In the midst of the Covid-19 pandemic, Judika wrote an album Teruslah Berharap which he released through his independent label Dua Anak Deo in December 2021. The album was inspired by the pandemic, and the song "Bagaimana Kalau Aku Tidak Baik-baik Saja" was inspired by the Korean television series Crash Landing on You. Within 10 months, the album sold 580,000 copies and went multi-platinum.

Personal life

After being in a relationship for 6 years with the Indonesian beauty pageant titleholder, Duma Riris Silalahi, they married on Judika's 35th birthday on August 31, 2013. Their holy matrimony was held at HKBP Balige Church, North Sumatra. Judika and Silalahi have two children, Cleo Deomora Boru Sihotang (born 2014) Judeo Volante Sihotang (born 2018).

Business and ventures
On October 14, 2016, Judika and his wife Duma Riris Silalahi established a record label, PT. Dua Anak Deo. They collaborate with Sony Music Entertainment to market, record and produce music videos. Newcomers who signed are Dnanda, Daniel Pattinama, Yan Josua, Axin and Nurlela.

Artistry

Judika was one of the singers who received the title KRH (Kanjeng Raden Haryo) Kencana Ningrat from the Surakarta Hadiningrat Palace, Central Java in 2015 because he was considered to have a major role in preserving the culture of the Nusantara through music.

Voice and musical style
Judika has a powerful chest voice, wide vocal range (3 octave). His vocal range starts from low B (B2) below middle C to B (B5) above high C. He can reach high C (C5), which is a high tone for men, without using falsetto.

Judika's music is generally pop, rock, folk and RnB on several songs. Even so, he also appeared several times to performed dangdut and jazz songs.

Songwriting
Most of Judika's songs are written from his romantic life with his wife, Duma Riris Silalahi. Silalahi was also involved in a number of songs' creative processes.

Discography

Albums
 One (2007)
 Setengah Mati Merindu (2010)
 Mencari Cinta (2013)
 Hati & Cinta (2014)
 The Best of Judika (2015)
 Judika (2017)
 Teruslah Berharap (2021)

Singles

Filmography

Awards and nominations

References

External links

 
 

1978 births
Living people
21st-century Indonesian singers
21st-century Indonesian male actors
People from North Sumatra
Indonesian pop singers
Indonesian rock singers
Indonesian male singers
Indonesian record producers